Milorad Milinković (born 1965) is a well known Serbian film director and screenwriter. He is best known for his film Frozen Stiff and for directing the first Serbian 3D film, Fifth Butterfly. He is also one of the Chasers in the Serbian version of the game show The Chase.

References

External links
 

1965 births
Living people
Film people from Belgrade
Serbian film directors
Serbian screenwriters
Male screenwriters